Carlo Rim (19 December 1902 – 3 December 1989) was a French film screenwriter, producer and director.

Born Jean Marius Richard, he made an anagram of his initials (RJM - treating I and J as the same letter) for his pseudonym, adding "Carlo" a popular Italian name in France at the time.

Filmography

As screenwriter
 1934 : Zouzou directed by Marc Allégret
 1935 :     directed by Maurice Tourneur
 1935 : Gaspard de Besse  directed by André Hugon
 1936 : Le Mort en fuite  directed by André Berthomieu
 1936 : Tarass Boulba directed by Alexis Granowsky
 1936 : Vingt-sept rue de la Paix directed by Richard Pottier
 1936 : L'Homme à abattre directed by Léon Mathot
 1936 : Blanchette directed by Pierre Caron
 1937 : Hercule  directed by Alexander Esway
 1937 : The Secrets of the Red Sea directed by Richard Pottier
 1937 : Êtes-vous jalouse ? directed by Henri Chomette
 1937 :  directed by Victor Tourjansky
 1938 : Éducation de prince directed by Alexander Esway
 1939 : Sacred Woods  directed by Léon Mathot
 1941 : Parade en sept nuits directed by Marc Allégret
 1942 : Simplet directed by Fernandel 
 1943 : Le Val d'enfer directed by Maurice Tourneur
 1943 : La Ferme aux loups directed by Richard Pottier
 1946 : L'Insaisissable Frédéric directed by Richard Pottier
 1947 : Miroir directed by Raymond Lamy
 1948 : Cité de l'espérance directed by Jean Stelli
 1949 : Monseigneur directed by Roger Richebé
 1950 : L'Amant de paille directed by Gilles Grangier
 1954 : Secrets d'alcôve, sketch Le Lit de la Pompadour directed by Jean Delannoy

As a director and screenwriter or writer - adapter
 1948 : L'Armoire volante  
 1951 : La Maison Bonnadieu  
 1952 : Les Sept Péchés capitaux, for the sketch : La gourmandise
 1953 : Virgile 
 1954 : Service Entrance
 1956 : Les Truands  
 1957 : Ce joli monde 
 1959 : Le Petit Prof
 1963 : Treize contes de Maupassant (television series)
 1965 : Don Quichotte (television series)
 1976 : Le Sanglier de Cassis  (television)

Actor
 1942: Simplet directed by Fernandel 
 1957: Ce joli monde
 1954: Secrets d'alcôve (idea) (segment Le Lit de la Pompadour)
 1953: Virgile (screenwriter)
 1952: Les sept péchés capitaux (scenario and dialogue)
 1951: L'amant de paille (adaptation)
 1949: Monseigneur (dialogues)
 1948: L'armoire volante (original scenario)
 1948: Cité de l'espérance (adaptation, dialogue)
 1947: Miroir
 1946: L'insaisissable Frédéric
 1943: La ferme aux loups (dialogues, scenario)
 1942: Simplet (dialogues, scenario)
 1939: Le bois sacré (adaptation, scenario)
 1938: Nostalgie (dialogue)
 1938: Êtes-vous jalouse ? (dialogue, scenario)
 1937: Les secrets de la Mer Rouge (adaptation, dialogue)
 1937: L'homme à abattre
 1936: 27 rue de la Paix (dialogue and scenario)
 1936: Tarass Boulba (dialogue)
 1935: Gaspard de Besse (dialogue and scenario)
 1934: Zouzou

References

1927 births
1989 deaths
Commandeurs of the Ordre des Arts et des Lettres